Shahrak-e Qods may refer to:
 Shahrak-e Qods, Ilam, a village
 Shahrak-e Qods, Dezful, a village in Dezful County, Khuzestan Province
 Shahrak-e Qods, Mahshahr, a village in Mahshahr County, Khuzestan Province
 Shahrak-e Qods, Shush, a village in Shush County, Khuzestan Province
 Shahrak-e Qods, Sistan and Baluchestan, a village in Bampur County, Sistan and Baluchestan Province
 Shahrak-e Qods (Tehran), a neighborhood

See also
 Qods (disambiguation)